Sponheim-Sayn was a County of Rhineland-Palatinate and North Rhine-Westphalia, Germany. It was created as a partition of Sponheim-Starkenburg in 1261, and it comprised the lands of the former County of Sayn. In 1283, it was divided into Sayn and Sayn-Homburg.

Count of Sponheim-Sayn
Godfrey I (1261–83)

1283 disestablishments in Europe
States and territories established in 1261